Towallum River, a perennial river of the Clarence River catchment, is located in the Northern Tablelands region of New South Wales, Australia.

Course and features
Towallum River rises on the slopes of the Great Dividing Range near Moleton, northwest of Coramba, and flows generally north and northwest before reaching its confluence with the Kangaroo River, below Koukandowie Mountain; over its  course.

See also

 Rivers of New South Wales
 List of rivers of Australia
 List of rivers of New South Wales (L–Z)

References

 

Rivers of New South Wales
Northern Tablelands